Entersekt is a Stellenbosch, South Africa-based fintech provider of mobile-based authentication and app security software protecting online and mobile banking and transactions.

In February 2016, the Colorado-based FirstBank opted for Entersekt’s Transakt technology to enhance the security of its mobile banking application. In July 2016, Entersekt partnered with Crealogix, a Swiss fintech company and Netcetera, a software company and digital payment expert.

In June 2017, Entersekt received an undisclosed amount as an investment from AlphaCode and BoE Private Equity Investments.

In 2017 April, Entersekt won the Best Mobile Security Technology Award at the 2017 Banker Africa Southern Africa Banking Awards.

Transakt 
Transakt is a stand-alone security app available on mobile, it uses digital certificate technology and proprietary mobile validation techniques to build a safe communication channel between the service providers and their customers’ cell phones and tablets.

References 

South African companies established in 2010
Companies based in Stellenbosch
Financial services companies established in 2010
South African brands